Dynamite!! 2010 was a mixed martial arts and kickboxing event in the annual New Year's Eve event promoted by Fighting and Entertainment Group that took place on December 31, 2010 at the Saitama Super Arena in Saitama, Japan. The event included bouts that encompass the DREAM, K-1 and K-1 World MAX banners. Just as the previous Dynamite!! 2009, with the official commentator Nozomi Sasaki, the event aired on TBS in Japan and HDNet in North America.


Background
FEG president Tanikawa had stated that the company planned on holding an event together with Sengoku Raiden Championship and this event may have a similar DREAM vs SRC format as Dynamite!! 2009. However, this did not happen as SRC held its own event, World Victory Road Presents: Soul of Fight.

Tanikawa has also stated that this Dynamite!! event will most likely be shortened (to around three hours) and the annual K-1 Koshien tournament will not take place at this event.

The title fight between Bibiano Fernandes and Hiroyuki Takaya was the last in the 63 kg. (139 lbs) weight class before it gets broken into the standard MMA bantamweight and featherweight divisions. DREAM plans on holding a Grand Prix in whichever of the two weight classes the champion does not decide to fight in. After winning the title, Hiroyuki Takaya stated that he would become the Featherweight (145 lbs) Champion.

The Aoki/Nagashima fight was first announced that there would be an alternate of four rounds, with one round under MMA rules and the next round, then they will change gloves and, fight under kickboxing rules. A coin toss will determine what rules they start under. However, it has later announced that the fight will feature one three-minute kickboxing round, followed by a standard five-minute MMA round. The fighters used open-fingered gloves throughout. If no winner were decided in the eight minutes of competition, the fight would have been declared an automatic draw.

A fight between Bob Sapp and Shinichi Suzukawa in a super-heavyweight “IGF rules” bout was set to feature a rule set similar to MMA, but with no closed fist strikes.  However, the fight was canceled due to Sapp attempting to re-negotiate his contract backstage prior to the event and eventually electing to withdraw from the contest.

Results

References

See also
 Dream (mixed martial arts)
 List of Dream champions
 2010 in DREAM

Dream (mixed martial arts) events
K-1 events
2010 in Japanese sport
2010 in kickboxing
2010 in mixed martial arts
Kickboxing in Japan
Sport in Saitama (city)